The first cabinet of Gheorghe Gheorghiu-Dej was the government of Romania from 2 June 1952 to 28 January 1953.

Ministers
The ministers of the cabinet were as follows:

President of the Council of Ministers:
Gheorghe Gheorghiu-Dej (2 June 1952 - 28 January 1953)

Vice Presidents of the Council of Ministers:
Ana Pauker (2 June - 24 November 1952)
Chivu Stoica (2 June 1952 - 28 January 1953)
Iosif Chișinevschi (2 June 1952 - 28 January 1953)
Gheorghe Apostol (2 June 1952 - 28 January 1953)

Minister of the Interior:
Alexandru Drăghici (2 June - 20 September 1952)
Pavel Ștefan (20 September 1952 - 28 January 1953)
Minister of the State Security:
Alexandru Drăghici (20 September 1952 - 28 January 1953)
Minister of Foreign Affairs:
Ana Pauker (2 June - 10 July 1952)
Simion Bughici (10 July 1952 - 28 January 1953)
Minister of Justice:
Stelian Nițulescu (2 June 1952 - 28 January 1953)
Minister of National Defense:
Emil Bodnăraș (2 June 1952 - 28 January 1953)
Minister of Finance:
Dumitru Petrescu (2 June 1952 - 28 January 1953)
Minister of the Metallurgy and Chemical Industries:
Carol Loncear (2 June 1952 - 28 January 1953)
Minister of Coal, Mines, and Petroleum:
Constantin Mateescu (2 June - 26 August 1952)
Minister of Petroleum and Natural Gas:
Constantin Mateescu (26 August 1952 - 28 January 1953)
Minister of Coal:
Mihail Suder (26 August 1952 - 28 January 1953)
Minister of Electricity:
Gheorghe Gaston Marin (2 June 1952 - 28 January 1953)
Minister of Light Industry:
Alexandru Sencovici (2 June 1952 - 28 January 1953)
Minister of Agriculture:
Constantin Prisnea (2 June 1952 - 28 January 1953)
Minister of Wood, Paper and Pulp Industries:
Mihai Suder (2 June 1952 - 28 January 1953)
Minister of Food Industry:
Dumitru Diaconescu (2 June 1952 - 28 January 1953)
Minister of Meat, Fish, and Milk Industries:
Pascu Ștefănescu (2 June 1952 - 28 January 1953)
Minister of State Agricultural Farms:
Ion Vidrașcu (13 July 1952 - 28 January 1953)
Minister of Forestry:
Constantin Popescu (24 November 1952 - 28 January 1953)
Minister of Internal Trade:
Vasile Malinschi (2 June 1952 - 28 January 1953)
Minister of Transport:
Alexa Augustin (2 June 1952 - 28 January 1953)
Minister of Post and Telecommunications:
Valter Roman (2 June 1952 - 28 January 1953)
Minister of Social Provisions:
Lotar Rădăceanu (2 June - 28 July 1952)
Pericle Negescu (28 July 1952 - 28 January 1953)
Minister of Health:
Vasile Mârza (2 June - 22 August 1952)
Octavian Berlogea (22 August 1952 - 28 January 1953)
Minister of Education:
Nicolae Popescu-Doreanu (2 June - 26 September 1952)
Ion Nistor (26 September 1952 - 28 January 1953)
Minister of Religious Affairs:
Vasile Pogăceanu (2 June 1952 - 28 January 1953)

Minister Secretary of State and Chairman of the State Control Commission:
Ion Vidrașcu (2 June - 13 July 1952)
Petre Borilă (13 July 1952 - 28 January 1953)

Minister Secretary of State and Chairman of the Art Commission:
Eduard Mezincescu (2 June - 26 September 1952)
Nicolae Popescu-Doreanu (26 September 1952 - 28 January 1953)

Minister Secretary of State and Chairman of the State Supply Commission:
Emil Stanciu (2 June 1952 - 28 January 1953)

Minister Secretary of State and Chairman of the Architecture and Construction Commission:
Nicolae Bădescu (15 December 1952 - 28 January 1953)

References

Cabinets of Romania
Cabinets established in 1952
Cabinets disestablished in 1953
1952 establishments in Romania
1953 disestablishments in Romania